Cow Wood and Harry's Wood is a  biological Site of Special Scientific Interest east of Handcross in West Sussex. it is in the High Weald Area of Outstanding Natural Beauty.

This area of ancient semi-natural woodland is crossed by ghylls, streams in steep valleys which have a warm and moist microclimate. Forty-seven species of breeding birds have been recorded, including wood warbler, willow tit, hawfinch and lesser spotted woodpecker.

References

Sites of Special Scientific Interest in West Sussex
Forests and woodlands of West Sussex